State Route 539 (SR 539) is a north–south state highway in the  northeastern quadrant of the U.S. state of Ohio. Its northern terminus is at its junction with State Route 301 in West Salem, just one block south of that route's junction with U.S. Route 42.

Route description

The entirety of State Route 539 is situated within the northwestern portion of Wayne County.  There is no segment of this route that is included within the National Highway System, a network of highways deemed to be most important for the country's economy, mobility.

History
State Route 539 was designated in 1964.  The route was established along the alignment that it utilizes to this day between State Route 302 near Wooster and State Route 301 in West Salem.  No changes of major significance have taken place to State Route 539 since its inception.

Major intersections

References

539
Transportation in Wayne County, Ohio